Agios Dimitrios Football Club (Greek: Π.Α.Ε. Άγιος Δημήτριος), also known as Brahami, is a Greek association football club based in Agios Dimitrios, Athens, Greece.

The association was founded in 1928, based on the idea of team of friends and residents of Agios Dimitrios. Club's colours are blue and red. In 2002, Agios Dimitrios was changed from amateur association to professional, aiming at the promotion to Super League Greece, but they came last at the Beta Ethniki league that year. Notable for winning the Athens Cup in 1975 and 1977. 

Association football clubs established in 1928
Football clubs in Attica
1928 establishments in Greece